A Funky Thide of Sings is a 1975 studio album by Billy Cobham.

Track listing
"Panhandler" (Billy Cobham) – 3:50
"Sorcery" (Keith Jarrett) – 2:26
"A Funky Thide of Sings" (Billy Cobham) – 3:23
"Thinking of You" (Alex Blake) – 4:12
"Some Skunk Funk" (Randy Brecker) – 5:07
"Light at the End of the Tunnel" (Billy Cobham) – 3:37
"A Funky Kind of Thing" (Billy Cobham) – 9:24
"Moody Modes" (Milcho Leviev) – 12:16

Personnel
Billy Cobham – synthesizer, percussion
Michael Brecker – saxophone
 Larry Schneider – saxophone
Randy Brecker – trumpet
Walt Fowler – trumpet
Tom Malone – trombone, piccolo
Glenn Ferris – trombone
Milcho Leviev – keyboards
John Scofield – guitar
Alex Blake – bass
Rebop Kwaku Baah – congas

Chart performance

References

1975 albums
Atlantic Records albums
Billy Cobham albums